Piero di Tommaso Soderini (March 17, 1451 – June 13, 1522) also known as Pier Soderini, was an Italian statesman of the Republic of Florence.

Biography
Soderini was born in Florence to Tommaso di Lorenzo Soderini, a member of an old family who had become famous in medicine, and his second wife Dianora Tornabuoni, also of a prestigious Florentine family and in-law of Piero de'Medici. Soderini's brother was the statesman and supporter of Savonarola, Paolo Antonio Soderini. Their third brother was Cardinal Francesco Soderini, bishop of Volterra. In 1481 he was Prior of the city, and later became a favourite of Piero di Lorenzo de' Medici, receiving from him, in 1493, the honour of being the Ambassador to the Kingdom of France. He was elected gonfaloniere for life in 1502 by the Florentines, who wished to give greater stability to their republican institutions, which had been restored after the expulsion of Piero de' Medici and the execution of Savonarola.

Soderini's rule proved moderate and wise, although he did not possess the qualities of a great statesman. He introduced a system of national militia in the place of foreign mercenaries.  During his government the long war with Pisa was brought to a close with the capture of that city by the Florentines in 1509. Niccolò Machiavelli, author of The Prince and Discourses on Livy, served under him as second chancellor and as ambassador to Cesare Borgia, Rome and France. Although Machiavelli initially had much respect for Soderini, his attitude was changed by the events that led to Soderini's fall.

Grateful to France, which had assisted him, Soderini always took the French side in Italian politics. But in 1512 the Medici returned to Florence with the help of a Spanish army, deposed Soderini, and drove him into exile. He took refuge at Orašac (near Dubrovnik) in Dalmatia, where he remained until the election of Pope Leo X, who summoned him to Rome and conferred many favours on him. Soderini lived in Rome for the rest of his life and worked for the good of Florence, to which he was never allowed to return.

He died in Rome in 1522 and was buried in the church of S. Maria del Popolo.

References

Bibliography

Acknowledgment
  This work in turn cites:
 Silvano Razzi, Vita di Pier Soderini (Padua, 1737)

Rulers of Florence
1451 births
1522 deaths
Ambassadors of the Republic of Florence
Italian politicians
15th-century people of the Republic of Florence
16th-century people of the Republic of Florence
16th-century rulers in Europe
Italian republicans